Mafra is a city located at the northern border of the state of Santa Catarina, Brazil. This city borders to the state of Paraná and its urban area is attached to the urban area of its interstate neighbour, Rio Negro. This city's population is composed primarily of descendants of European immigrants, especially from Germany (including Volga Germans) and Poland. This city is also known for its honey, which is said to have excellent quality.

References

Municipalities in Santa Catarina (state)